Dangerous Games is a 1974 film directed by Veljo Käsper and starring Leonhard Merzin & Jüri Järvet. It is also known under its Russian name, Opasnye Igry (Опасные игры).

Plot 
The capital of Estonia is occupied by Germans. Three local boys plan to blow up the cinema where German soldiers often spend time. However, their plans change when they accidentally meet a mysterious stranger. A complicated and dangerous game begins where the rules are not set by the schoolkids.

Cast 
René Urmet	       ... 	Old man
Sven-Erik Nielsen	 ... 	Tiuks
Viktor Perebeinos	 ... 	Trumm
Jüri Järvet	 ... 	Õline
Leonhard Merzin	 ... 	2241

See also 
List of World War II films

External links 
 

1974 films
Soviet drama films
Soviet-era Estonian films
Estonian-language films
Soviet World War II films
Estonian drama films